Clifton Chenier (June 25, 1925 – December 12, 1987), was an American Creole musician known as a pioneer of zydeco, a style of music which arose from Creole music, with R&B, blues, and Cajun influences.  He sang and played the accordion and won a Grammy Award in 1983.

He was known as the King of Zydeco, and also billed as the King of the South.

Biography
Chenier was a native of Leonville, Louisiana, near Opelousas. He spoke Louisiana French as a first language.  

Chenier began his recording career in 1954, when he signed with Elko Records and released Cliston's Blues [sic], a regional success. In 1955 he signed with Specialty Records and garnered his first national hit with his label debut "Ay-Tete Fi" (Hey, Little Girl) (a cover of Professor Longhair's song). The national success of the release led to numerous tours with popular rhythm and blues performers such as Ray Charles, Etta James, and Lowell Fulson. He also toured in the early days with Clarence Garlow, billed as the Two Crazy Frenchmen. Chenier was signed with Chess Records in Chicago, followed by the Arhoolie label.

In April 1966, Chenier appeared at the Berkeley Blues Festival on the University of California campus and was subsequently described by Ralph J. Gleason, jazz critic of the San Francisco Chronicle, as "... one of the most surprising musicians I have heard in some time, with a marvelously moving style of playing the accordion ... blues accordion, that's right, blues accordion."

Chenier was the first act to play at Antone's, a blues club on Sixth Street in Austin, Texas. Later in 1976, he reached a national audience when he appeared on the premiere season of the PBS music program Austin City Limits. Three years later in 1979 he returned to the show with his Red Hot Louisiana Band.

Chenier's popularity peaked in the 1980s, and he was recognized with a Grammy Award in 1983 for his album I'm Here. It was the first Grammy for his new label Alligator Records. Chenier followed Queen Ida as the second Louisiana Creole to win a Grammy.

Chenier is credited with redesigning the wood and crimped tin washboard into the vest frottoir, an instrument that would easily hang from the shoulders. Cleveland Chenier, Clifton's older brother, also played in the Red Hot Louisiana Band.  He found popularity for his ability to manipulate the distinctive sound of the frottoir by rubbing several bottle openers (held in each hand) along its ridges.

During their prime, Chenier and his band traveled throughout the world.

Later years and death
Chenier suffered from diabetes which eventually forced him to have a foot amputated and required dialysis because of associated kidney problems.

He died of diabetes-related kidney disease in December 1987 in Lafayette, Louisiana. His funeral took place at Immaculate Heart of Mary Church in Lafayette.

Legacy and tributes
Since 1987, his son C. J. Chenier (born Clayton Joseph Thompson) has carried on the zydeco tradition by touring with Chenier's band and recording albums.

Rory Gallagher wrote a song in tribute to Chenier entitled "The King of Zydeco". Paul Simon mentioned Chenier in his song "That Was Your Mother", from his 1986 album Graceland, calling him the "King of the Bayou." 
Sonny Landreth recalls growing up on the rhythm of Clifton and Cleveland and the Red Hot Louisiana Band in 
South of I-10, songtitle and name of the album released in 1995.
John Mellencamp refers to "Clifton" in his song "Lafayette", about the Louisiana city where Chenier often performed.  The song is on Mellencamp's 2003 album Trouble No More. Zachary Richard mentioned Chenier in his song "Clif's Zydeco" (on Richard's 2012 album Le Fou).
The Squeezebox Stompers' "Zydeco Train" says, "Clifton Chenier, he's the engineer."

The jam band Phish often covers Chenier's song "My Soul" in live performances.

Chenier is the subject of Les Blank's 1973 documentary film, Hot Pepper.

Awards and honors
Chenier was a recipient of a 1984 National Heritage Fellowship awarded by the National Endowment for the Arts, which is the United States government's highest honor in the folk and traditional arts.

He was inducted posthumously into the Blues Hall of Fame in 1989, and the Louisiana Music Hall of Fame in 2011.

In 2014, he was a recipient of the Grammy Lifetime Achievement Award.

In 2015, the Library of Congress deemed Chenier's album Bogalusa Boogie to be "culturally, historically, or artistically significant" and selected it for preservation in the National Recording Registry.

Partial discography
Cliston's Blues (Elko Records), 1954
Ay-Tete Fi (Specialty Records), 1955
Louisiana Blues & Zydeco (Arhoolie Records), 1965
Bon Ton Roulet ! (Arhoolie), 1967
Bogalusa Boogie (Arhoolie), 1975
Frenchin' the Boogie (Blue Star), 1976
Boogie in Black and White (with swamp pop musician Rod Bernard, Jin Records), 1976
Red Hot Louisiana Band (Arhoolie), 1977
 New Orleans (GNP Crescendo Records GNP 2119) 1978
Boogie & Zydeco (Sonet Records SNTF 801), 1979
I'm Here (Alligator Records), 1982

See also
List of Grammy Hall of Fame Award recipients (A–D)

References

External links
 
 Zydeco Cajun Music & Dance – Historical 

1925 births
1987 deaths
People from Opelousas, Louisiana
20th-century African-American male singers
American accordionists
American blues singers
National Heritage Fellowship winners
Singers from Louisiana
Alligator Records artists
Bell Records artists
Charly Records artists
Imperial Records artists
Specialty Records artists
Tear Drop Records artists
Zydeco accordionists
Deaths from kidney failure
Louisiana Creole people
American amputees
Deaths from diabetes
Grammy Lifetime Achievement Award winners
20th-century accordionists
Arhoolie Records artists
African-American Catholics